The 1921–22 Southern Branch Cubs men's basketball team represented the Southern Branch of the University of California during the 1921–22 NCAA men's basketball season and were members of the Southern California Intercollegiate Athletic Conference. The cubs were led by first year head coach Pierce "Caddy" Works. They finished the regular season with a record of 9–1 and were conference champions with a record of 9–1. The Cubs also played non-conference games against  and  but these games are not listed in the official record books.

Previous season
The 1921–22 Southern Branch Cubs finished with a record of 9–2 under second year coach Fred Cozens. Cozens stepped downed as head coach at the end of the season and remained as Director of Physical Education at the Southern Branch.

Roster

Schedule

|-
!colspan=9 style=|Regular Season

Source

Notes

References

UCLA Bruins men's basketball seasons
Southern Branch Cubs Basketball
Southern Branch Cubs Basketball
Southern Branch